Wilków may refer to:

Wilków, Głogów County in Lower Silesian Voivodeship (south-west Poland)
Wilków, Świdnica County in Lower Silesian Voivodeship (south-west Poland)
Wilków, Złotoryja County in Lower Silesian Voivodeship (south-west Poland)
Wilków, Hrubieszów County in Lublin Voivodeship (east Poland)
Wilków, Opole Lubelskie County in Lublin Voivodeship (east Poland)
Wilków, Lesser Poland Voivodeship (south Poland)
Wilków, Świętokrzyskie Voivodeship (south-central Poland)
Wilków, Masovian Voivodeship (east-central Poland)
Wilków, Silesian Voivodeship (south Poland)
Wilków, Namysłów County in Opole Voivodeship (south-west Poland)
Wilków, Prudnik County in Opole Voivodeship (south-west Poland)
Wilków Wielki in Dzierżoniów County

See also
Wilkow (surname), people with this surname